Eleftherios Neos (born 6 September 1999) is a Cypriot tennis player.

Neos has a career high ATP doubles ranking of 1446 achieved on 27 November 2017.

Neos represents Cyprus at the Davis Cup where he has a W/L record of 7–2.

Neos is studying at University of Portland, since 2018.

Davis Cup

Participations: (7–2)

   indicates the outcome of the Davis Cup match followed by the score, date, place of event, the zonal classification and its phase, and the court surface.

Games of the Small States of Europe

Doubles 2 (2 victory)

Mixed Doubles 2 (1 victory; 1 runner-up)

References

External links

1999 births
Living people
Cypriot male tennis players
Competitors at the 2018 Mediterranean Games
Mediterranean Games competitors for Cyprus